Marion Madine (born 8 December 1970) is an Irish swimmer. She competed in two events at the 1996 Summer Olympics.

References

External links
 

1970 births
Living people
Irish female swimmers
Olympic swimmers of Ireland
Swimmers at the 1996 Summer Olympics
Place of birth missing (living people)